Fossilbrook is a rural locality in the Shire of Mareeba, Queensland, Australia. In the  Fossilbrook had a population of 5 people.

Geography 
The Tablelands railway line passes through the locality with the locality being served by Lyndbrook railway station.

History 
Fossilbrook Provisional School opened in 1908. On 1 January 1909 it became Fossilbrook State School. It closed on 1926.

In the  Fossilbrook had a population of 5 people.

References 

Shire of Mareeba
Localities in Queensland